The Andean saddle-back tamarin (Leontocebus leucogenys) is a species of saddle-back tamarin, a type of small monkey from South America. The Andean saddle-back tamarin was formerly considered to be a subspecies of the brown-mantled tamarin, L. fuscicollis.  It is closely related to Illiger's saddle-back tamarin.  It is endemic to Peru and its type locality is in the Department of Huanuco, Peru.

The IUCN rates it as least concern from a conservation standpoint.

References

Leontocebus
Taxa named by John Edward Gray
Mammals described in 1866